The 2012 Heartland Championship is the 7th provincial rugby union competition, since the 2006 reconstruction, involving the 12 amateur rugby unions in New Zealand. The 2012 season will follow the style of 2011. The tournaments' round robin stage will see the 12 teams play 8 games. 1st to 4th on the ladder at the end of the 8 weeks will play off for the Meads Cup, while 5th to 8th will play off for the Lochore Cup.

2012 Heartland Championship Teams

The 2012 Heartland Championship is being contested by the following teams:

2012 Heartland Championship Table

Individual points scorers

correct as of 29 September 2012

Round Robin

The following fixtures were released on 28 March 2012.

Week 1

Week 2

Week 3

Week 4

Week 5

Week 6

Week 7

Week 8

Finals

SemiFinals

Meads Cup

Lochore Cup

Finals

Meads Cup

Lochore Cup

References

Heartland Championship
3